Peritapnia fabra is a species of beetle in the family Cerambycidae. It was described by Horn in 1894.

References

Acanthoderini
Beetles described in 1894